Gayle Moher (born April 7, 1957) is a British-American professional bodybuilder.

Biography
As a teenager, she competed in several beauty pageants. She took up bodybuilding in 1990 after visiting the United States of America. Moher earned her pro card by winning the NPC Nationals in 1996, and competed in her first professional contest the following year. Around this time, she began training other women from a gym in her basement. In February 2000, Moher opened her own combination gym and spa, Gayle Moher's Face and Bodyworks. Her greatest success as a professional to date was winning the 1999 Jan Tana Classic.

Personal life
Moher has a daughter named Courtney and currently lives in Scottsdale, Arizona. Her life was featured in the episode Muscle Worship of the 2007 Five documentary series Hidden Lives.

Contest history
1995 NPC Nationals - 17th (MW)
1996 NPC Jr. Nationals - 2nd (MW)
1996 NPC Nationals - 1st (MW & Overall)
1997 Ms. International - 5th
1997 Jan Tana Classic - 4th
1997 IFBB Ms. Olympia - 12th
1998 Ms. International - Disqualified
1998 Jan Tana Classic - 2nd
1998 IFBB Ms. Olympia - 11th
1999 Ms. International - 6th
1999 Pro World Championship - 3rd
1999 Jan Tana Classic - 1st
1999 IFBB Ms. Olympia - 11th
2000 Ms. International - 5th (LW)
2000 Jan Tana Classic - 2nd (MW)
2001 Ms. International - 6th (HW)
2001 IFBB Ms. Olympia - 5th (LW)
2002 Ms. International - 4th (HW)
2002 Jan Tana Classic - 3rd (MW)
2002 GNC Show of Strength - 7th (LW)
2002 Southwest USA Pro Cup - 2nd (HW)
2003 Ms. International - 6th (HW)
2004 GNC Show of Strength - 4th (LW)
2004 Night of Champions - 4th (LW)
2005 New York Pro - 4th (LW)
2005 Charlotte Pro - Withdrew (LW)
2006 Atlantic City Pro - 4th
2006 IFBB Ms. Olympia - 9th
2007 Sacramento Pro - 4th (LW)
2009 Atlantic City Pro - 7th
2010 Phoenix Pro - 9th

References

1957 births
American female bodybuilders
British expatriates in the United States
English female bodybuilders
Living people
Professional bodybuilders
21st-century American women